Prince usually refers to:
 Prince, a member of royalty or of the high aristocracy
 Prince (musician) (1958–2016), American singer-songwriter and musician

Prince or The Prince may also refer to:

Places

Canada
Prince (electoral district), Prince Edward Island
Prince, Ontario, a township
Prince, Saskatchewan, a hamlet
Prince County, Prince Edward Island

United States
Prince, West Virginia, an unincorporated census-designated place
Prince Island, a small island near San Miguel Island, California

Elsewhere
Princé, a commune in the department of Ille-et-Vilaine, France
Prince Islands, off the coast of Istanbul, Turkey

People
Prince (given name)
Prince (surname)

Arts and entertainment

Fictional characters
Polly Prince, title character in the film Along Came Polly, played by Jennifer Aniston
Prince (Prince of Persia), from the video game Prince of Persia
Prince (Sand Land), or Beelzebub, the main character in the Sand Land universe
Prince, an epic card found in Clash Royale
Prince, a character from the television show Lexx
The Prince, the main character of the video game Katamari Damacy
The Prince, a character from Disney's Snow White and the Seven Dwarfs (1937 film)

Television
The Prince (TV series), an animated sitcom on HBO Max
"Prince" (New Girl), a 2014 episode

Films
Prince (1969 film), a Hindi film
The Prince (1996 film), a Malayalam film
Prince (2010 film), a Hindi film
Prince (2011 film), a Kannada film
The Prince (2014 film), an American gangster thriller
The Prince (2019 film), a Chilean film
Prince (2022 film), an Indian romantic comedy

Music
Prince (album), a 1979 album by Prince
"Prince" (song), by Versailles
"Prince", a song by Vanessa Carlton
"Prince", a song by Deftones from the album Diamond Eyes
"The Prince" (song), a single by Madness
"The Prince", a song by Diamond Head
"The Prince", a song by Madeon

Paintings
Orange Prince (1984), a painting by Andy Warhol of the singer Prince, also known as Prince

In print
The Prince (anthology), a 2002 book by Jerry Pournelle and S.M. Stirling
The Prince (novel), a 2005 novel by Francine Rivers

Brands and products
Prince (cigarette), a brand of cigarettes
Prince (software), software product, XML + CSS formatter, from YesLogic, formerly Prince XML
Prince, a brand of pasta owned by New World Pasta
PRINCE2, a structured project management method

Naval ships
HMS Prince, six Royal Navy ships
HMS Rajah (D10), an escort aircraft carrier at one point named USS  Prince, transferred to the Royal Navy in 1943

Organizations and enterprises
Prince Hotels, a Japanese company headquartered in Tokyo
Prince Music Theater, a non-profit theatrical producing organization in Philadelphia, Pennsylvania, US
Prince Sports, an American manufacturer of sporting goods
Prince's Theatre, a former name of Shaftesbury Theatre, a London West End theatre

Transportation

Aircraft
Fairey Prince (H-16), a British experimental aircraft engine
Percival Prince, a British light transport aircraft first flown in 1948
Prince Aircraft, an American manufacturer of aircraft propellers

Motor vehicles
Daewoo Prince, a mid-size luxury car that was produced in South Korea between 1991 and 1997
Prince engine, a four-cylinder petrol engine manufactured by BMW
Prince Motor Company, a producer of automobiles in Japan from 1952 until their merger with Nissan in 1966

Railway locomotives
Prince, one of the original locomotives on the Festiniog Railway
Prince, a South Devon Railway 2-4-0ST steam locomotive

Other uses
The Prince, a 16th century political treatise written by Niccolò Machiavelli
PRINCE (cipher), a block cipher targeting low latency, unrolled hardware implementations

See also
Prince's (ward), an administrative division of the London Borough of Lambeth, England
Prince's Building, an office tower and shopping centre in Hong Kong
Princes (disambiguation)
Prinz (disambiguation)
Prinze (surname)